Kokomo is a female western lowland gorilla that lives in the San Diego Zoo Safari Park. She was moved from the Oklahoma City Zoo to the San Diego Zoo Safari Park. The western lowland gorilla is a Critically Endangered species.

Life 
Kokomo weighs 229 pounds. She has given birth six times, having given birth to twins at the Oklahoma City Zoo in 1999.

Recent birth 
It is noted by zookeepers that she is a very protective mother, even refusing letting them touch the baby which was named Leslie. The baby is the second baby born to Kokomo and Winston, a male Western lowland gorilla. The baby was born on October 18, 2016 and weighed 3.5-4.5 pounds. The baby will be part of the troop of eight gorillas at the San Diego Zoo Safari Park.  The troop is on display at Gorilla Forest daily. The troop consists of one adult male, three adult females, 5-year-old Monroe, 2-year-old Joanne, and 8-year-old Frank. This birth is an important step in saving the critically endangered species.

References 

Individual gorillas
Individual primates in the United States